Love Shack  is a 2010 mockumentary about the adult film industry written, produced and directed by Gregg Saccon and Michael B. Silver. Other producers include Rick Jaffa and Amanda Silver.

Love Shack reunites a dysfunctional "family" of adult film stars for a memorial porn shoot following the death of a legendary producer, Mo Saltzman.

Plot

Cast

 Diora Baird as LaCienega Torrez
 America Olivo as Fifi LeBeaux
 Ian Gomez as Mo Saltzman
 Molly Hagan as Debbie Vanderspiegl
 Brad Hall as Dr. Alan Rudnick
 Michael B. Silver as Jerry Sphincter
 Mark Feuerstein as Marty Sphincter
 Christopher Boyer as Mac Hollister
 Philippe Brenninkmeyer as Oliver Snowden-Hicks
 Mercy Malick as Autumn Lane
 Lenny Citrano as Roger Hogman
 Kyle Colerider-Krugh as Carl Munson
 Amberlee Colson as Hallie Lujah
 Jamie Denbo as Gretchen Becky
 Nancy Fish as Honey Malone
 Pete Gardner as Doug Vanderspiegl
 David Neher as Ned Billings
 Brian Palermo as Ted Haynes
 Ben Shenkman as Skip Blitzer
 Lindsey Stoddart as Whitney Sweet
 Paul Vaillancourt as Andre Cox
 Susan Yeagley as Kat Waters

References

External links
 
 
 

2010 films
American sex comedy films
2010s English-language films
Films about filmmaking
American mockumentary films
Films about pornography
2010s sex comedy films
2010 comedy films
2010s American films